Dewald van Niekerk (born 3 June 1997 in Port Elizabeth) is a South African professional squash player. As of October 2021, he was ranked number 142 in the world. He is the brother of Lizelle Muller.

References

1997 births
Living people
South African male squash players
21st-century South African people